In theoretical physics, an M2-brane, is a spatially extended mathematical object (brane) that appears in string theory and in related theories (e.g. M-theory, F-theory). In particular, it is a solution of eleven-dimensional supergravity which possesses a three-dimensional world volume.

Description
The M2-brane solution can be found by requiring  symmetry of the solution and solving the supergravity equations of motion with the p-brane ansatz. The solution is given by a metric and three-form gauge field which, in isotropic coordinates, can be written as 
 
where  is the flat-space metric and the distinction has been made between world volume  and transverse  coordinates.

See also
String theory
Membrane (M-theory)
M-theory

References

String theory
Physical cosmology